Michael Scott, sometimes credited as Michael J. F. Scott, is a Canadian film and television director and producer.

Associated in his early career with the National Film Board of Canada, he is a five time Genie Award winner as producer of the short films Ted Baryluk's Grocery, The Big Snit, Get a Job, Village of Idiots and Runaway, a two-time Academy Award nominee for his work on The Big Snit and Whistling Smith, and a two-time Gemini Award nominee for the television films Ikwé and Lost in the Barrens.

References

External links

Canadian film directors
Canadian film producers
Canadian television directors
Canadian television producers
National Film Board of Canada people
Living people
Year of birth missing (living people)